Beleń-Kolonia  is a village in the administrative district of Gmina Zapolice, within Zduńska Wola County, Łódź Voivodeship, in central Poland.

References

Villages in Zduńska Wola County